Beechworth Football & Netball Club, nicknamed the Bushrangers, is an Australian rules football and netball club based in Beechworth, Victoria. Its teams currently play in the Tallangatta & District Football League.

The club was known as the Beechworth Bombers prior to joining the Tallangatta & District Football League (T&DFNL), but they became the Bushrangers due to Dederang-Mount Beauty having the red and black colours and having the nickname of "Bombers".

Before playing the T&DFNL, Beechworth took part in the Ovens & Murray and the Ovens & King leagues.

History
The "Beechworth Football Club" was apparently formed in 1861. There is no newspaper evidence of football taking place in and around Beechworth between 1861 and 1875. In April, 1875 a meeting was supposed to be held at the Star Hotel, Beechworth to organise a football club, but it did not eventuate.

In April 1876, a meeting was held at Dreyer's Corner Hotel to re-form the Beechworth FC, which was a success, with players joining up and matches taking place.

While Beechworth FC joined the Victoria Football Association (VFA) in 1877 (the first season of the competition), it appears they were affiliated with the VFA and not an active playing club. Beechworth FC never played any football in Beechworth in 1877.

An Annual General Meeting was held in early 1878, with club office bearers appointed and while the club did not play in any official football competitions between 1878 and 1891, they did play regular matches against other mining towns such as Chiltern and Rutherglen in most years.

In 1887, a football fixture was published in the Ovens and Murray Advertiser, with Beechworth FC competing against the following football clubs - Benalla, Degamero, Oxley, Oxley Trades and Wangaratta.

In the late 1880s there were two football teams in Beechworth. One was the "Beechworth FC" and the other was the "Wanderers FC", which was based at Hurdle Flat, near Stanley and after a meeting between officials of both clubs in April 1892, they merged under the name "Beechworth District Wanderers Football Club" and adopted a red and black striped guernsey, before joining the Ovens and Murray Football League in 1893.

In September 1894, Essendon visited Beechworth and had a comfortable win over the “District Wanderers”.

The club played in the O&MFL until 1898, when they went into recess in 1899, they returned to the O&MFL from 1900 to 1902, then once again went into recess in 1903. Beechworth finished in equal top position with Corowa and Excelsoir in 1900, but Beechworth withdrew from the final series as they were drawn to play the first final at the Southern ground. Beechworth thought this to be grossly unjust and withdrew from the finals.

Beechworth FC then joined the North East Central Football Association in 1904. then joined the Ovens & King league in 1905, winning three consecutive premierships in 1912, 1913 and 1914. Beechworth then left the O&KFA and re-joined the O&MFL in 1915, only to withdraw from the competition in July 1915, due to "the splendid response by playing members of the club to the appeal for recruits to serve their King and country" in World War One.

The club suspended its activities from 1916 to 1918 during the World War I, returning to the O&KFL in 1919.

Beechworth then played the O&MFL from 1924 to 1928, then returned to the Ovens & King in 1929 until 1941. A new recess came in 1941 with the Second World War.

At the end of the Second World War, Beechworth entered the Chiltern and District league under the new name of the Beechworth Football Club. In 1946 it was admitted to the Ovens and King League and the next year a seconds team was formed and played in the Myrtleford-Bright District Football League from 1947 to 1949. This side and the thirds team were instigated by Ern Guppy, who was a wonderful man for the Beechworth Football Club. He was made a life member in 1952.

When the Myrtleford-Bright DFL folded in 1952, the seconds side joined the Yackandandah & District Football League.

In 1950, 1951 and 1956 Beechworth won senior premierships, and was beaten by only two points by Bogong for the 1955 O&KFL pennant.

In 1961 the club again won the premiership under Bill Comensoli. In this year it formed a thirds team, which was affiliated with the Wodonga Junior Football Association with Fred Jensen as its coach and G. Beel as its manager.

In 1974 under coach Mick Brenia it again was successful and D. Cooper had coached it to runners-up for two successive years, it won the 1979 flag under Rob Forrest.

There was no further success until 2000, when under coach Michael Quirk, it won two in a row, and was defeated by Moyhu in the 2002 grand final.

At the end of the 2003 season, The Beechworth Football Club applied for an application to join the Tallangatta & District Football League, but was refused by the Ovens and King FL board, so the Beechworth Football Club took the appeal to Victoria Country Football League and won the appeal to join the Tallangatta & District Football League in 2004.

With joining the T&DFNL, Beechworth had to choose a new nickname and new jumper style (Because Dederang-Mt Beauty were known as the Bombers) so after a vote, the Beechworth Football Club new nickname was the Bushrangers and would wear Red and Royal Blue vertically striped jumpers.

In their first year of the T&DFNL, the Beechworth "Bushrangers" Football Club would make the finals, but would lose the Elimination Final to Dederang-Mt Beauty and finished 5th.

In 2005 the Bushrangers would only win 5 games (out of 16) and miss the finals for the first time in 10 years.

In 2006 The Beechworth Football Club amalgamated with the Netball club and is now known as Beechworth Football & Netball Club Inc.

The Beechworth Football Club would again taste success. Coached by Shaun Pritchard and captained by Brayden Carey, the Beechworth Bushrangers defeated Yackandandah to win the 2010 Grand Final.

Beechworth's tenure in the Ovens & King lasted until 2004, when the club joined Tallangatta & District Football League, where they have played up to present days.

Club incarnations

Hurdle Flat Football Club, 1885–88 
In 1885, a club at Hurdle Flat was established and played football against Stanley and Beechworth. The Hurdle Flat Wanderers later became known as the Beechworth Wanderers around 1889 and eventually merged with the Beechworth Football Club in 1892 and became known as the Beechworth District Wanderers FC and were often referred to in newspaper reports as the "District Wanderers".

Beechworth Mechanics Football Club, 1886 
The above club was formed in 1886 and played their first match against Hurdle Flat FC.

Beechworth Wanderers Football Club, 1889–1891, 1930–1935 
It appears the Beechworth Wanderers FC evolved from the Hurdle Flat Wanderers in 1889 and were based at Hurdle Flat, near Stanley. The Wanderers played regular matches against Yackandandah, Myrtleford, Beechworth and the Two Mile Rovers football club's. up until they merged with the Beechworth Football Club in early 1892.

Beechworth Wanderers FC reformed in 1930 and entered the Chiltern & District Football Association from 1930 to 1935 and wore a white jumper with a red V. The Wanderers and Beechworth FC would then merge again in early 1936 and entered the Ovens & King Football League as Beechworth United FC from 1936 to 1941 and adopted a black jumper with a red sash.

Beechworth Union Junior Football Club, 1891–1900 
This junior club was re-formed in April 1892 and adopted a blue and white coloured jumper with red socks. They became the Beechworth Junior FC in 1900, when they entered the O&MFL as inadvertently became a senior side again.

Beechworth Stars FC, 1938–39 
The Beechworth Stars FC (Beechworth Reserves side) were admitted into the Myrtleford - Bright FL in 1938 and played there in 1939, being runners up to Myrtleford Wanderers FC in both years. With the commencement of World War Two, this competition unfortunately did not reform in 1940.

Uniform

Football competitions timeline

Seniors 
1861: Club formed ?
1861 - 1875: ?
1876: Club re-formed.
1877: Beechworth FC becomes affiliated with the Victoria Football Association
1878 - 1891: Club active, but did not play in any official competitions, but did play “friendly” games against other local clubs most years.
1892: Beechworth FC & Beechworth Wanderers FC merged to form the Beechworth District Wanderers FC
1893 - 1898: Ovens & Murray Football League (Beechworth District Wanderers FC)
1899: Beechworth FC seniors in recess, but junior team active.
1900 - 1902: Ovens & Murray Football League
1903: Beechworth FC seniors in recess, but junior team active.
1904: North East Central Football Association 
1905 - 1906: Ovens & King Football League
1907: Ovens & Murray Football League
1908 - 1914: Ovens & King Football League
1915: Ovens & Murray Football League
1916 - 1918: Club / League in recess due to WW1
1919 - 1923: Ovens & King Football League
1924 - 1928: Ovens & Murray Football League
1929 - 1935: Ovens & King Football League
1936 - 1941: Ovens & King Football League (Beechworth United FC)
1942 - 1944: Club / League in recess due to WW2
1945: Chiltern & District Football Association
1946 - 2003: Ovens & King Football League
2004 - 2019: Tallangatta & District Football League
2020: Club / League in recess due to COVID-19
2021 - 2022: Tallangatta & District Football League

Football Premierships 
Seniors
 Ovens & Murray Football League (3)
1893, 1894 1897
 Ovens & King Football League (14) 
1912, 1913, 1914, 1937, 1938, 1939, 1950, 1951, 1956, 1961, 1974, 1979, 2000, 2001
 Tallangatta & District Football League (1) 
2010

Reserves
 Chiltern & District Football Association (1)
1932 (Beechworth Wanderers FC)
Ovens & King Football League (10)
1955, 1956, 1957, 1959, 1964, 1966, 1967, 1974, 1982, 1993

Thirds
Ovens & King Football League (7)
1980, 1983, 1986, 1989, 1990, 1994, 1995
 Tallangatta & District Football League (1) 
2007

Fourths
 Tallangatta & District Football League (2)
2008, 2017

Football Runners Up
Seniors
 Ovens & Murray Football League (3)
1895, 1896, 1898
Ovens & King Football League (16)
1906, 1911, 1930, 1940, 1955, 1960, 1969, 1972, 1975, 1976, 1978, 1983, 1988, 1989, 1995, 2002.
Tallangatta & District Football League (1)
2009

Reserves
Chiltern & District Football Association
1933
Myrtleford & Bright District Football League (2)
1938, 1939 (Beechworth Stars FC)
Ovens & King Football League (6)
1965, 1977, 1979, 1983, 1986, 1988,

Thirds
Ovens & King Football League (7)
1978, 1979, 1982, 1984, 1985, 1987, 1991

Netball Premierships
Ovens & King Football League
A. Grade Netbball
 Nil

B. Grade
1976

C. Grade
1985

Tallangatta & District Football League
 Beechworth NC have not won a T&DFNL premiership.

League Best & Fairest Awards
Senior Football
Ovens & King Football League
Hughes Medal
1933 - Keith Parris
Bryon Trophy
1954 - Tim Lowe
Tip Lean Trophy
1956 - Tim Lowe
Clyde Baker Medal
1977 - John Rutten
1979 - Con Madden
1985 - Con Madden
2001 - Anthony Mihaljevic
2002 - John Allen

Tallangatta & District Football League
George Barton Medal
2009 - Brayden Carey
2010 - Brenton Surrey

Reserves
Ovens & King Football League
1961 - Vivian Stone
1966 - Barry Pope
1982 - William Grant
1998 - Shaun French
2000 - Troy McKendrick

Thirds
Ovens & King Football League
Fred Jensen Medal
1980 - Brett Norman
1983 - John Ward# (# 1983 - Craig Williams, Greta FC won on a countback from Ward). Ward never received a retrospective medal like others have in the O&KFNL Baker Medal.
1987 - Shaun French
1995 - Daniel Cooper
1997 - Terry Crossman

VFL / AFL Players
The following footballers played with Beechworth, prior to playing senior football in the VFL/AFL, and / or drafted, with the year indicating their VFL/AFL debut.
1898 - John McDermott - South Melbourne
1898 - Harry Thompson - St. Kilda & Carlton
1898 - Albert Trim - South Melbourne & Carlton
1902 - Bill Fahey - South Melbourne
1906 - Ed Harrison - South Melbourne
1925 - Bill Keane - Geelong
1939 - Allan Mullenger - South Melbourne
1939 - Bobby Mullenger - South Melbourne
1944 - Russell Hill - Essendon
1948 - Fred Pemberton - St. Kilda
1950 - Mac Hill - Collingwood
1972 - Ivan Russell - Geelong

The following footballers were drafted or played senior VFL / AFL football prior to playing / coaching with the Beechworth FNC, with the year indicating their first year at Beechworth.
1913 - Tom Maguire - Geelong
1913 - Bill Marchbank - Fitzroy
1932 - Frank Kelly - Collingwood
1933 - Keith Parris - Essendon
1936 - Jack Flanigan - Hawthorn
1939 - Steve Bravo - Hawthorn
1963 - Wally Russell - Richmond & Geelong
1966 - Frank Hogan - South Melbourne
1998 - Mark Perkins - Collingwood
1999 - Michael Quirk - St. Kilda
2021 - Shaun Baxter - Footscray

Senior Football Honourboard

References

External links
 
 1897 - Ovens & Murray FA Premiers: Beechworth FC team photo
 1938 - Ovens & King FL Premiers: Beechworth FC team photo
 1950 - Beechworth FC team photo

Ovens & Murray Football League clubs
Beechworth
1861 establishments in Australia
Sports clubs established in 1861
Australian rules football clubs established in 1861
Netball teams in Victoria (Australia)